MSL may refer to:

University degrees 
 Master of Sustainability Leadership, a master's degree in sustainability leadership studies
 Master of Science in Leadership, a master's degree in leadership studies
 Master of Studies in Law, a master's degree for students who wish to study the law but do not want to become attorneys
 Master of Science of Law, a master's degree for students who wish to study the law but do not want to become attorneys

Business 
 Medical science liaison, a healthcare consulting professional
 Manning Selvage & Lee, now MSLGROUP, public relations firm, part of Publicis Groupe

Organizations 
 RoboCup Middle Size League, robot soccer competition
 MBCGame StarCraft League, StarCraft tournament in Korea
 Milwaukee School of Languages, in Wisconsin, US
 Microscopical Society of London, original incarnation of the Royal Microscopical Society

Places 
 Marshall railway station, Victoria, Australia, station code
 Northwest Alabama Regional Airport, US, IATA code

Science and technology 
 Mars Science Laboratory, a NASA mission which landed rover Curiosity
 Master Subsidy Lock, a type of cell phone SIM lock used by U.S. CDMA carriers
 Materials Science Laboratory, an ESA payload on ISS
 Mean sea level
 Metal Shading Language, used for Apple's Metal graphics API
 Microgravity Science Laboratory, first flown on STS-83
 Maximum segment lifetime of TCP segment in networking
 Midsternal line, an imaginary plane running through the median section of a sternum
 mIRC scripting language (abbreviated as mSL), a scripting language embedded in mIRC, an IRC client, used for automation of actions (usually for bots) and customization of the client
 Mission and Spacecraft Library, a website that tracks satellites
 Moisture sensitivity level, for semiconductor handling
 Multilayer soft lithography, a fabrication process
 Multiple single-level, computer security systems

Sign languages 
 Macedonian Sign Language, the sign language of the deaf community in Macedonia
 Malagasy Sign Language, a sign language used for communication among hearing impaired people in Madagascar
 Maritime Sign Language, a sign language descended from British Sign Language
 Mongolian Sign Language, a sign language used in Mongolia
 Moroccan Sign Language, a sign language of the deaf community of Tetouan and some other cities of Morocco

Sports
 Malaysia Super League, a top-tier football league in Malaysia
 Major Series Lacrosse, a Senior A box lacrosse league in Canada
 Major Soccer League, an indoor soccer league in the United States from 1978 to 1992
 Memphis Sport Live, radio show, Tennessee, US
 Mzansi Super League, a cricket tournament in South Africa